604 is the debut studio album by English electronic music band Ladytron, released in the United States on 6 February 2001 by Emperor Norton Records and in the United Kingdom on 12 March 2001 by Invicta Hi-Fi. It was co-produced, engineered and mixed by Lance Thomas. Some of the tracks had been previously released on their EPs Miss Black and Her Friends (1999), Mu-Tron EP (2000) and Commodore Rock (2000).

On 20 July 2004, 604 was reissued in the US with four bonus tracks, the first three being live recordings made on 16 May 2003 at the Central Military Club in Sofia, Bulgaria. The January 2011 re-release of the album on Nettwerk also features these same bonus tracks.

In a 2002 interview with online magazine Chaos Control, Daniel Hunt stated that the album was named after the area code for British Columbia. Reuben Wu drew the cover of the European edition of 604.

Critical reception

604 received general acclaim from music critics. At Metacritic, which assigns a normalised rating out of 100 to reviews from mainstream publications, the album received an average score of 81, based on 11 reviews, which indicates "universal acclaim".

In March 2001, 604 was selected as Album of the Month by Muzik magazine.

As of July 2002, the album had sold 20,000 copies in the United States, according to Nielsen SoundScan.

Singles
"He Took Her to a Movie" was released as the album's lead single. The song was recorded for £50, and features guest vocals from Lisa Eriksson of San Francisco-based electronic duo Techno Squirrels. Upon its release, it was named the "Single of the Week" by NME magazine. The track was inspired by Kraftwerk's 1978 song "The Model".

"Playgirl" was released as the album's second single. It peaked at number 89 on the UK Singles Chart.

"The Way That I Found You" was released as the album's third and final single. It reached number 88 on the UK Singles Chart. The single's B-side, "Holiday 601", was included on Ladytron's second studio album, Light & Magic, retitled "NuHorizons".

Track listing

604 (Remixed & Rare)
On 1 September 2009, Redbird Records and Cobraside Distribution released a compilation of remixes, B-sides and rarities titled 604 (Remixed & Rare). The cover is the negative of the US cover for 604.

Personnel
Credits adapted from the liner notes of 604.

 Ladytron – production, design
 Lance Thomas – additional production, engineering
 Eddy Schreyer – mastering
 Lisa Eriksson – guest vocals on "He Took Her to a Movie"
 Tom Dolan – design
 Sebastian Meyer – cover photography (US edition)

Release history

References

2001 debut albums
Emperor Norton Records albums
Ladytron albums